North Central Railway College, Tundla, also referred to as NR  Inter College, Tundla, (formerly known as Northern Railway Inter College, Tundla) is a Senior Secondary School in the Firozabad district. The Junior College was established in 1882.

About
North Central Railway College is a senior secondary school built in 1882 and is one of the oldest institutes in northern India. It has a large campus of almost 65 acres and offers education from Grades 1-12.

Campus
The North Central Railway College is in the eastern part of the town. The railway station is approximately 1.5  km from the school, with the main gate of the campus just opposite the railway hospital. The campus has a playground, and college hall, where students generally gather during functions and exhibitions. This college has both indoor and outdoor gaming facilities, as well as a cricket field, basketball court, volleyball court, and many athletic facilities.

History
The school was initially established as an NCC (National Cadet Corps) center and ammunition house in 1878 by Britishers. Later around 1882, it had been converted into Primary School for British Officers' children.

This school was originally named the Northern Railway Inter College as it is funded by the Indian railway and Tundla was in the northern railway region. Later after the railway zones were created, it was renamed to North Central Railway College as it is located in the North Central Railway Zone.

Infrastructure
The college campus is approximately 65 acres.  All of the college's departments and laboratories are housed on the campus.  The campus also has an auditorium, computer centre, and sporting facilities.

Student life
Extracurricular activities include participation in NCC and Scouting.  Various sports facilities are available on the campus. The college also has 40 acres of adjacent playground.

Training institutes of Indian Railways
Primary schools in Uttar Pradesh
High schools and secondary schools in Uttar Pradesh
Intermediate colleges in Uttar Pradesh
Firozabad district
1882 establishments in India
Educational institutions established in 1882